This is a comprehensive chronological list of national leaders of Belarus since its first independence, in 1918, including its presidents both before and after the Soviet era, and the Soviet leaders themselves, who, unlike the Presidents, were not formal Heads of State.

Belarusian Democratic Republic (1918–20)

BNR in exile (since 1920)

Presidents-in-exile
In Vilnius to 1925, then in Prague, presently in Canada:
Pyotra Krecheuski (November 1920 – 8 March 1928)
Vasil Zakharka (8 March 1928 – 6 March 1943)
Mikola Abramchyk (6 March 1943 – 29 May 1970)
Vintsent Zhuk-Hryshkyevich (May 1970 – November 1982)
Jazep Sazhych (November 1982 – 1997)
Barys Rahula (1997, acting)
Ivonka Survilla (1997–present)

Lithuanian–Byelorussian Soviet Socialist Republic (1919–20)

Chairman of the Central Executive Committee

Byelorussian Soviet Socialist Republic (1920–91)

Chairman of the Supreme Council

Republic of Belarus (1991–present)

Chairman of the Supreme Council (1991–1994)

President of Belarus (1994–present)  

As of 2022, there were 2 living former National Leaders of Belarus:Vyacheslav Kuznetsov (as acting Chairman of the Supreme Council) and Myechyslaw Hryb (as acting Chairman of the Supreme Council)

The most recent death of a former National Leaders of Belarus was Stanislav Shushkevich (served from 1991 to 1994), on 3 May 2022, aged 87.

See also
President of Belarus
List of prime ministers of Belarus
Government of Belarus

References

National leaders
National Leaders